J59 may refer to:
 County Route J59 (California)
 , a minesweeper of the Royal Navy
 Johor State Route J59, in Malaysia
 Parabiaugmented dodecahedron